Linda Rosa, or Linda Rose, is a former populated place, formerly in San Diego County, now in Riverside County, California.  The town site of Linda Rosa was located southwest of the old town of Murrieta, California on the west side of Murrieta Creek.  Linda Rosa is a name derived from Spanish meaning "pretty rose".

Linda Rosa was one of the many land development schemes of the 1880s in Southern California. The company spent approximately $5,000 building a depot, but the railroad did not make Linda Rosa a scheduled stop. The Linda Rosa Hotel was built by the land company in 1888 at an estimated cost of $15,000. The large hotel provided a place where visitors and land buyers could stay.

Linda Rosa Fruit Canning and Preserving Company was formed on June 30, 1888, to grow and can fruit and vegetables.  Linda Rosa had its own post office, Linda Rose, from November 20, 1888, to March 20, 1890. When the land boom went bust, the town lots failed to sell and the office was closed and mail service was moved to Temecula Station.  The hotel was torn down and used to build a house.  With the failure of his development, Parker Dear went bankrupt and lost the rancho to his bank in 1893.

References

External links
 Map of Linda Rosa San Diego County, California,  Santa Rosa Land & Improvement Co. A. Hart, President., (1887); "Situated on California Southern R.R. 60 miles from San Diego. 119 miles from Los Angeles. The future manufacturing and agricultural Center of Southern California." from Huntingon Digital Library website hdl.huntington.org.

Ghost towns in California
Former settlements in Riverside County, California